Sous lieutenant Gilbert Marie de Guingand was a French World War I flying ace credited with eight aerial victories before being killed in a flying accident.

Early life
Gilbert Marie de Guingand was born at Viroflay, France on 21 July 1891. He began his military service in the 21e Regiment d'Infanterie Coloniale before transferring to aviation.

World War I
After transferring to aviation service, de Guingand trained until he received Pilot's Brevet number 2722 on 21 February 1916. He was assigned to Escadrille C34, a Caudron squadron, in July 1916. He subsequently retrained as a fighter pilot. He was then posted to Escadrille N15, a Nieuwpoort unit. On 20 April 1917, he spent a single day in Escadrille N88 as it was forming; however, on 22 April he joined Escadrille N48, still another Nieuwpoort squadron. He began his string of aerial victories there.

On 3 September 1917, he was wounded in action while in combat against several German aircraft. He then received the Médaille militaire for his valor; the award citation shows he had risen to the rank of Adjutant. He was also awarded the Belgian Croix de guerre. After recuperation, he returned to combat; as his squadron had upgraded to Spads, his final four victories were probably scored flying this type. At any rate, he ran his winning streak to eight confirmed victories by 7 June 1918, and was promoted to sous lieutenant in the process.

On 17 June 1918, he became a Chevalier of the Légion d'honneur as a reward for his fighting prowess. The citation not only refers to his eight credited victories, but also specifically to his highly hazardous practice of balloon busting. Additionally, the citation describes de Guingand being shot down behind enemy lines while on a reconnaissance and trench strafing sortie, as well as his subsequent evasion of the Germans and his return to French lines.

Gilbert Marie de Guingand did not survive the war, as he died in a takeoff accident on 22 October 1918 in Revigny, less than three weeks before the armistice.

List of aerial victories
See also Aerial victory standards of World War I
Confirmed victories are numbered chronologically; unconfirmed victories are denoted "u/c".

Footnotes

References

Bibliography
 

1891 births
1918 deaths
French World War I flying aces